Serine/threonine-protein kinase MARK1 is an enzyme that in humans is encoded by the MARK1 gene.

References

Further reading

EC 2.7.11